Ælfwald (born between 759 and 767 AD) was king of Northumbria from 779 to 788. He is thought to have been a son of Oswulf, and thus a grandson of Eadberht Eating.

Ælfwald became king after Æthelred son of Æthelwald Moll was deposed in 778. He was murdered, probably at Chesters, by ealdorman Sicga on 23 September 788. He was buried at Hexham Abbey where he was considered a saint.

Ælfwald was succeeded by his first cousin Osred, son of Alhred and Osgifu, daughter of Eadberht Eating. Ælfwald's sons Ælf and Ælfwine were killed in 791 on the orders of King Æthelred.

See also
 List of monarchs of Northumbria

References

Further reading
 Higham, N.J., The Kingdom of Northumbria AD 350–1100. Stroud: Sutton, 1993.

External links
 

8th-century births
788 deaths
Year of birth uncertain
Northumbrian saints
Northumbrian monarchs
8th-century Christian saints
8th-century English monarchs
Burials at Hexham Abbey